Svendsen is a Danish and Norwegian surname. It was originally a patronymic which means "son of Svend".

Notable people with the surname include: 
 Arnljot Ole Strømme Svendsen (1921–2022), Norwegian economist
 Asger Svendsen (contemporary), Danish musician and music professor
 Bud Svendsen (1915–1996), American professional football player
 Christian Valdemar Svendsen (1890–1959), Danish Olympic gymnast
 Conrad Bonnevie-Svendsen (1898–1983), Norwegian government minister and priest
 Conrad Svendsen (1862–1943), Norwegian priest and teacher for the deaf
 Conrad Vogt-Svendsen  (1914–1973), Norwegian priest
 Elga Olga Svendsen (1906–1992), Danish film actress
 Emil Hegle Svendsen (born 1985), Norwegian biathlete
 Eyvind Johan-Svendsen (1896–1946), Danish stage and film actor
 Flemming Kofod-Svendsen (born 1944), Danish minister in the Lutheran Church of Denmark
 George Svendsen (1913–1995), American professional football and basketball player
 Hartvig Svendsen (1902–1971), Norwegian politician
 Kester Svendsen (1912–1968), educator, author, chess administrator
 Johan Svendsen (1840–1911), Norwegian composer, conductor and violinist
 Kenneth Svendsen (born 1954), Norwegian politician
 Kjell Arild Svendsen (born 1953), Norwegian politician
 Lars Svendsen (born 1970), Norwegian philosopher
 Linda Svendsen (born 1954), Canadian screenwriter and author of Norwegian heritage
 Nicklas Svendsen (born 1986), Danish football player
 Ole Svendsen (born 1952), Danish boxer
 Olga Svendsen (1883–1942), Danish stage and film actress
 Rupert Svendsen-Cook (born 1990), British race-car driver of Norwegian heritage
 Sander Svendsen (born 1997), Norwegian footballer
 Sigvald Svendsen (1895–1956), Norwegian politician
 Svend Rasmussen Svendsen (1864–1945), Norwegian American impressionist artist
 Therese Svendsen (born 1989), Swedish swimmer
 Torgeir Svendsen (1910–1981), Norwegian politician
 Zoë Svendsen, British academic and director

See also
 Svendsen Peninsula, Ellesmere Island, Nunavut, Canada

Danish-language surnames
Norwegian-language surnames
Patronymic surnames
Surnames from given names